2449 Kenos, provisional designation , is a bright Hungaria asteroid and medium-sized Mars-crosser from the inner regions of the asteroid belt, approximately 3 kilometers in diameter. It was discovered by American astronomer William Liller at Cerro Tololo Inter-American Observatory in Chile, on 8 April 1978, and named after Kenos from Selknam mythology. A minor-planet moon was discovered around the asteroid on 27 February 2015.

Orbit and classification 

Kenos is a member of the Hungaria family, which form the innermost dense concentration of asteroids in the Solar System. IT orbits the Sun in the inner main-belt at a distance of 1.6–2.2 AU once every 2 years and 8 months (963 days). Its orbit has an eccentricity of 0.17 and an inclination of 25° with respect to the ecliptic. Based on assumption made by the Collaborative Asteroid Lightcurve Link, the body has a high albedo of 0.4, which is typical for E-type asteroids with a magnesium silicate surface (also see Enstatite chondrite).

Physical characteristics 

In the Tholen taxonomy, Kenos is an E-type asteroid. PanSTARRS has characterized it as a CX-type, which transitions between the C-type and X-type asteroids.

Two more recent observations confirmed the 3.85-hour period.

Naming 

This minor planet was named after Kenos, the first man in the Selknam mythology of the Native Americans of Tierra del Fuego, sent by the Supreme Being to bring order into the world. He created the human race by using peat to make male and female organs, taught them language and instructed them in rules to fashion a harmonious society. The official naming citation was published by the Minor Planet Center on 6 February 1993.

References

External links 
  
 Lightcurve plot of 2449 Kenos, Palmer Divide Observatory, B. D. Warner (2010)
 Asteroid Lightcurve Database (LCDB), query form (info )
 Dictionary of Minor Planet Names, Google books
 Asteroids and comets rotation curves, CdR – Observatoire de Genève, Raoul Behrend
 Discovery Circumstances: Numbered Minor Planets (1)-(5000) – Minor Planet Center
 
 

002449
002449
Discoveries by William Liller
Named minor planets
002449
19780408
002449